Brittonella chardoni is a species of beetle in the family Cerambycidae, the only species in the genus Brittonella.

References

Hesperophanini